The 2018–19 Macedonian Third Football League was the 27th season of the third-tier football league in North Macedonia, since its establishment.

North

Teams

Table

Center

Teams

Table

Southeast

Teams

Table

East

Teams

Table

West

Teams

Table

Southwest

Teams

Table

Promotion play-offs

For Second League - West

See also 
 2018–19 Macedonian Football Cup
 2018–19 Macedonian First Football League
 2018–19 Macedonian Second Football League

References 

Macedonian Third Football League seasons
North Macedonia 3
3